FC Mashʼal-2 is an Uzbekistann association football club based in Mubarek. Mashʼal-2 acts as the farm club of Mashʼal Mubarek. Currently it plays in First League.

History
The club was formed in 2005 under name Yangiyer. Since 2010 club participates in league as Mashʼal Akademiya. Mashʼal-2 is feeder of main team. Farm clubs in Uzbekistan play in the same football pyramid as their senior team rather than a separate league. But farm teams cannot play in the same division as their senior team. Feeder teams are also permitted to participate in Uzbekistani Cup.

In 2009 Mashal-2 finished runners-up in Uzbekistan First League, but was not eligible to promote to top division as Mashʼal Mubarek was playing in Uzbek League.

Formers players of Mashʼal-2 Ganisher Kholmurodov and Sardor Rahkmanov played in 2011 FIFA U-17 World Cup for Uzbekistan U-17 team.

Name changes
 2005: Yangiyer
 2006–2007: Mashʼal-2
 2008–2009: Mashʼal-Akademiya
 2009: Mashʼal-Sport
 2010–2013: Mashʼal-Akademiya
 2014: Mashʼal-2

Current squad

Squad for season 2011

Honours
 Uzbekistan First League runners-up: 2009

Managerial history
  Alexander Khomyakov (2011–2012)
  Dilshod Andaev (2014–)
  Diyorbek Mirzaboev (February 2017- )

References

External links
 FC Mashʼal Official site 
 FC Mashʼal-2 – soccerway

Football clubs in Uzbekistan
2005 establishments in Uzbekistan
Association football clubs established in 2005